The Duncan River is a river in the West Coast Region of New Zealand. It arises in the Red Hills Range and flows north-east to the Gorge River, which flows west into the Tasman Sea.

See also
List of rivers of New Zealand

References

Land Information New Zealand - Search for Place Names

Westland District
Rivers of the West Coast, New Zealand
Rivers of New Zealand